The 2016–17 Kansas Jayhawks men's basketball team represented the University of Kansas in the 2016–17 NCAA Division I men's basketball season, which was the Jayhawks' 119th basketball season. The Jayhawks, members of the Big 12 Conference, played their home games at Allen Fieldhouse and were led by 14th year head coach Bill Self. They finished the season 31–5, 16–2 in Big 12 play to win their 13th consecutive Big 12 regular season title, tying UCLA's record for consecutive regular season conference titles. They lost in the quarterfinals of the Big 12 tournament to TCU. They received and at-large bid to the NCAA tournament as a No. 1 seed in the Midwest region. The appearance was their 28th consecutive appearance, the longest current active streak and the longest ever in NCAA Tournament history. In the Tournament, they defeated UC Davis and Michigan State to advance to the Sweet Sixteen. There they defeated Purdue before losing in the Elite Eight to Oregon.

The Jayhawks entered the season with 40 straight wins at Allen Fieldhouse, which extended to 51 games during the season before it ended on February 5, 2017 with an 89–92 loss to Iowa State, which was the longest active home arena winning streak in the nation when it ended.

Preseason

Departures

Graduation

Early draft entrants

Hired agent

Did not initially hire agent
Starting with the 2016 NBA draft, if a player declares for the draft, but does not hire an agent, it allows the player to return to their school even after participating in the combine, as long as they decide by May 25.

Transfers

Coaching changes

Recruiting class

Class of 2016

|-
| colspan="7" style="padding-left:10px;" | Overall recruiting rankings:     Scout: 9     Rivals: 7       ESPN: 7 
|}

Transfers 

|-
|}

Roster

Schedule and results

|-
!colspan=12 style="background:#; color:white;"|Exhibition

|-
!colspan=12 style="background:#; color:white;"| Regular season

|-
!colspan=12 style="background:#"| Big 12 Tournament

|-
!colspan=12 style=";"| NCAA tournament

Source:

Rankings

Post-season awards
Bill Self
Big 12 Coach of the Year

Frank Mason III
Big 12 Player of the Year
1st team All-Big 12
Consensus National Player of the year
Consensus 1st Team All-American
 Bob Cousy Point Guard of the Year award
Josh Jackson
Big 12 Freshman of the Year
1st team All-Big 12
Big 12 All-Newcomer Team
2nd Team All-American (SN)
3rd team All-American (NABC, AP)

Devonte' Graham
2nd team All-Big 12

Landen Lucas
Honorable Mention All-Big 12

Primary source, unless otherwise noted:

References

Kansas Jayhawks men's basketball seasons
Kansas
2016 in sports in Kansas
2017 in sports in Kansas
Kansas